Back To The Innocence is the second solo album by the keyboard player and guitarist Jonathan Cain. The song "Faithfully" is the hit single he wrote for Journey. "Just the Thought of Losing You" was co-written with Michael Bolton, an out-take from Bolton's 1987 album The Hunger, on which Cain performed.

Track listing
All songs written By Jonathan Cain, except where noted.
"Wish That I Was There With You" (Cain, John Waite)4:12
"Waiting On The Wind" 4:20
"Something Sacred" (Jonathan Cain, Andre Pessis) 4:05
"Full Circle" (Cain, Pessis) 4:04
"Back To The Innocence" 3:08
"Little River" 3:46
"Faithfully" 4:38
"Just The Thought Of Losing You" (Cain, Michael Bolton) 4:23
"Women Never Forget" (Cain, David Mullen) 3:45
"My Old Man" 2:58
"Distant Shores" (Cain, Robbie Patton) 3:55
"When The Spirit Comes" 4:13
"Baptism Day" 4:07

European import track listing
"Something Sacred"
"Full Circle"
"Hometown Boys"
"Back To The Innocence"
"Summer Of Angry Son"
"What The Gypsy Said"
"Women Never Forget"
"My Old Man"
"The Great Divide"
"When The Spirit Comes"
"Family Hand-Me-Downs"
"The Waiting Years"
"Distant Shores"
"Little River"

Personnel
Jonathan Cain: Keyboards, Piano, Synthesizers (all songs); Acoustic (track 1, 2, 7 & 8), Twelve-String Acoustic (track 6) and Rhythm Guitars (track 1), Bass (tracks 1 & 8), Vocals
Neal Schon: Guitar solo on track 1
Lyle Workman: Guitars (acoustic on track 13, electric on 3, 4 and 9-13)
Steve Gornell: Slide Guitars (track 2)
Glenn Letsch (tracks 2, 4, 6, 7, 9 & 13), Mario Cippolina (track 3), Myron Dove (tracks 10 & 12): Bass
Steve Smith (tracks 3, 6, 10 & 12), Tommy "Mugs" Cain (tracks 1, 2, 4, 7-9 & 13): Drums, Percussion
Annie Stocking, Becky West, Jenny Meltzer, Lora Leigh Christiansen, Marisa Kerry, Rolph Hartley, Sandy Cressman: Backing Vocals

Production
Arranged and Produced by Jonathan Cain
Recorded by Jonathan Cain, Wally Buck and Dale Everingham
Mixed by Jonathan Cain, with assistance by Joseph Mihalko

References

1995 albums
Albums produced by Jonathan Cain